The Hotel Astoria is a currently closed historic five-star luxury hotel in the Freedom Quarter of Brussels, Belgium. Built in 1909 for the Brussels International Exposition of 1910, in a true Parisian spirit, the hotel's Louis XVI facade and majestic interior lend it a distinctly aristocratic appearance. It is considered among the finest luxury hotels in the world, and has served as a famous meeting place for kings and other great statesmen and world personalities. The hotel has been closed since 2007 and is set to reopen in late 2023 as the Corinthia Grand Hotel Astoria Brussels.

The hotel is located at 101–103, rue Royale/Koningsstraat, not far from the Congress Column and Brussels Park. This area is served by Brussels-Congress railway station, the metro stations Parc/Park (on lines 1 and 5) and Botanique/Kruidtuin (on lines 2 and 6), as well as the tram stop / on lines 92 and 93.

History

Origins and early history

The Hotel Astoria was built in 1909 for the Brussels International Exposition of 1910, at the request of King Leopold II, to replace the former Hotel Mengelle, a vast neoclassical complex designed in the second quarter of the 19th century by the architect T.-F. Suys. The current hotel was designed by Henri Van Dievoet (1869–1931), a nephew of the architect Joseph Poelaert, in an eclectic Beaux-Arts style, mixing borrowings from the Louis XV and Louis XVI styles. Van Dievoet furnished the hotel's 108 rooms in the Louis XV style, with luxurious amenities such as hot water and electric chandeliers. The laying of the first stone took place in 1909, and the hotel opened in 1910, just in time for the International Exposition.

One of the three most famous hotels in Brussels during the Belle Époque—together with the Grand Hotel on the Boulevard Anspach/Anspachlaan (currently destroyed) and the Hotel Métropole on the Place de Brouckère/De Brouckèreplein—it belongs to the category of large European hotels. After the First World War, the hotel resumed its activities under the management of Georges Marquet who would soon create many luxurious hotels across Europe.

Contemporary
From 1975, chamber music could be heard every Sunday morning as part of the Astoria Concerts. For the wedding of then-Prince Philippe and Princess Mathilde in 1999, King Albert II and Queen Paola organised a grand reception in the hotel. Two years later, it was also there that then-Prime Minister Guy Verhofstadt and Minister Johan Vande Lanotte concluded an agreement with Swissair about the fate of Belgium's national airline, Sabena, in the greatest secrecy.

Since 21 September 2000, the hotel has been listed as a protected monument by the Monuments and Sites Directorate of the Brussels-Capital Region. The hotel closed in 2007 and was sold to Global Hotels & Resorts, owned by Saudi Arabian Sheikh Mohamed El-Khereji. In 2010, work began on renovations, including the demolition of an adjacent building for construction of a new wing for the hotel. The work was never completed and the hotel remained vacant. It was acquired by Corinthia Hotels in 2016 and is set to reopen under the name Corinthia Grand Hotel Astoria Brussels in late 2023.

Famous guests
The Hotel Astoria has become a mythical place in Brussels. For a century, it has been the meeting place for kings and greats of this world. In the guestbook, many famous personalities can be found: heads of state and prime ministers like Adenauer, Ben-Gurion, Churchill, Eisenhower, Edward Heath, Édouard Herriot, Hirohito and the Shah; artists like Dalí; writers like James Joyce and Marguerite Yourcenar; actors like Pierre Fresnay and Gérard Philippe; singers like Maurice Chevalier; and musicians like Khachaturian, Menuhin, Oistrakh and Rubinstein.

Gallery

See also
 Hotel Le Plaza, Brussels
 Hotel Métropole, Brussels
 History of Brussels
 Belgium in "the long nineteenth century"

References

Notes

External links

 Description of the Hotel Astoria of Brussels
 Film by Sabine Ringelheim about the Hotel Astoria of Brussels

Astoria
City of Brussels
Buildings and structures in Brussels
Protected heritage sites in Brussels
Astoria
Heritage hotels
World's fair architecture in Belgium
Buildings by Henri Van Dievoet